The women's 10 kilometres walk event at the 1990 Commonwealth Games was held in Auckland. It was the first time that a women's race walking event had taken place at the Commonwealth Games.

Results

References

30
1990
1990 in women's athletics